Kawdana East Grama Niladhari Division is a  Grama Niladhari Division of the  Dehiwala Divisional Secretariat  of Colombo District  of Western Province, Sri Lanka .  It has Grama Niladhari Division Code 539/42B.

Lotus Grove  are located within, nearby or associated with Kawdana East.

Kawdana East is a surrounded by the  Karagampitiya, Udyanaya, Bellanvila, Attidiya North, Katukurunduwatta, Kawdana West and Nedimala  Grama Niladhari Divisions.

Demographics

Ethnicity 

The Kawdana East Grama Niladhari Division has  a Sinhalese majority (74.6%) and a significant Moor population (15.4%) . In comparison, the Dehiwala Divisional Secretariat (which contains the Kawdana East Grama Niladhari Division) has  a Sinhalese majority (60.5%), a significant Moor population (20.8%) and a significant Sri Lankan Tamil population (14.5%)

Religion 

The Kawdana East Grama Niladhari Division has  a Buddhist majority (66.1%) and a significant Muslim population (16.1%) . In comparison, the Dehiwala Divisional Secretariat (which contains the Kawdana East Grama Niladhari Division) has  a Buddhist majority (54.3%), a significant Muslim population (22.6%) and a significant Hindu population (12.1%)

References 

Colombo District
Grama Niladhari divisions of Sri Lanka